Toad Hall Bar is a gay bar in San Francisco's Castro District, in the U.S. state of California.

History
The site formerly housed The Pendulum. Toad Hall's facade was restored in 2008 for the filming of Milk.

References

External links

 

Castro District, San Francisco
LGBT drinking establishments in California